Where No Life Dwells is the debut album by the Swedish death metal band Unleashed. It was released in 1991 by Century Media Records, and was produced by Waldemar Sorychta, who would go on to produce more Century Media acts such as Lacuna Coil.

Critical reception
Jason Anderson of AllMusic rated the album 4 out of 5 stars, writing in part, "Pure and enthusiastic, this disc plays like an audio textbook for those interested in the state and design of early-'90s death metal excess... As death metal debuts go, this is a very impressive one from the stylistically myopic but musically consistent Unleashed."

Track listing
All Songs Written By Johnny Hedlund.

Personnel
Unleashed
Johnny Hedlund: bass guitar, vocals
Fredrik Lindgren: guitar
Tomas Olsson: guitar
Anders Schultz: drums, percussion
Production
Executive Producer: R. Kampf
Produced By Waldemar Sorychta
Recorded & Engineered By Siggi Bemm

References

External links
"Where No Life Dwells" at discogs

Unleashed (band) albums
1991 debut albums
Century Media Records albums
Albums produced by Waldemar Sorychta